As the Arma dei Carabinieri is the fourth service of the Italian armed forces, the Ranks and rank insignia of the Carabinieri are designed according to the military rank structure of Italy. Carabinieri personnel belongs to four different career paths, the Officer career, the Inspector career, the Sovrintendente career, and the basic Carabinieri career.

Ruolo ufficiali 
Candidates for the non-technical Officer career of the Carabinieri are recruited through the Military Academy of Modena. At the end of the two-year period, students graduate in "Legal Sciences" and are appointed Sottotenente. The cycle of studies continues for another three years at the Carabinieri Officer School, at the end of which the students obtain a master's degree in Law and, on a voluntary basis, also one in "Internal and external security sciences" (in agreement with the University of Rome Tor Vergata).

The directly appointed  are trained for two years at the Carabinieri Officer School, obtaining a master's degree in Law and promotion to

Ruoli Ispettori
Candidates for the Inspector career are by law recruited to 70% by internal or civilian applicants with a high school diploma, to 20% from the Sovrintendente career, and to 10% from the basic Carabinieri career. The former candidates attend a three-year university-based training process at the School of Marshals and Brigadiers of the Carabinieri, graduating with a Bachelor's degree in "Legal Sciences of Security" at the University of Rome Tor Vergata, while the latter candidates are trained for six months at the School of Marshals and Brigadiers of the Carabinieri.

Ruoli Sovrintendente
The former candidates are trained during one month, and the latter candidates during three months, at the School of Marshals and Brigadiers of the Carabinieri.

Ruoli Appuntati e Carabinieri
Candidates for the basic carabinieri career are by law recruited to 70% from serving soldiers with one or four year enlistments as temporary service volunteers, and to 30% from civilian life irrespective of previous military service. Initial enlistment is for a period of four years, after which permanent status is achieved. Training is one year at one of five Carabinieri schools.

See also 
 Italian Army ranks
 Italian Navy ranks
 Italian Air Force ranks
 Italian Police Ranks

References 

Italy
Military ranks of Italy